The 2011–12 season was Alloa Athletic's first season back in the Scottish Third Division, having been relegated from the Scottish Second Division at the end of the 2010–11 season. Alloa also competed in the Challenge Cup, League Cup and the Scottish Cup.

Summary
Alloa finished first in the Third Division, and were promoted as champions to the Second Division. They reached the first round of the Challenge Cup, the first round of the League Cup and the second round of the Scottish Cup.

Management
They were managed for season 2011–12 under the management of Paul Hartley. He replaced Allan Maitland, who was sacked towards the end of the previous season.

Results & fixtures

Third Division

Challenge Cup

Scottish League Cup

Scottish Cup

Player statistics

Squad 
Last updated 5 May 2012 

 

|}

Disciplinary record 

Includes all competitive matches.
Last updated 5 May 2012

Awards

Last updated 4 May 2012

League table

Transfers

Players in

Players out

References

Alloa Athletic F.C. seasons
Alloa Athletic